Nonresistance (or non-resistance) is "the practice or principle of not resisting authority, even when it is unjustly exercised". At its core is discouragement of, even opposition to, physical resistance to an enemy. It is considered as a form of principled nonviolence or pacifism which rejects all physical violence, whether exercised on individual, group, state or international levels. Practitioners of nonresistance may refuse to retaliate against an opponent or offer any form of self-defense. Nonresistance is often associated with particular religious groups, such as Anabaptist Christianity.

Sometimes non-resistance has been seen as compatible with, even part of, movements advocating social change. An often-cited example is the movement led by Mohandas Gandhi in the struggle for Indian Independence. While it is true that in particular instances (e.g., when threatened with arrest) practitioners in such movements might follow the line of non-resistance, such movements are more accurately described as cases of nonviolent resistance or civil resistance.

History

Anabaptist Christianity, which emerged in the Radical Reformation of the 16th century, became defined by its adherence to the doctrine of nonresistance, which they teach is found in the Bible in : “do not resist him who is evil.”

The term nonresistance was later used to refer to the Established Church during the religious troubles in England following the English Civil War and Protestant Succession. 

Nonresistance played a prominent role in the abolitionist movement in the nineteenth-century United States. 

Leo Tolstoy, Adin Ballou, and Mahatma Gandhi were notable advocates of nonresistance. However, there were variations between them. Gandhi's Satyagraha movement was based on a belief in resistance that was active but at the same time nonviolent, and he did not believe in using non-resistance (or even nonviolent resistance) in circumstances where a failure to oppose an adversary effectively amounted to cowardice. 'I do believe,' he wrote, 'that where there is only a choice between cowardice and violence, I would advise violence.'"

Christian theology

Christian nonresistance is based on a reading of the Sermon on the Mount, in which Jesus says:

Members of the Anabaptist Christian (Mennonite, Amish, Hutterite, Schwarzenau Brethren, River Brethren, Apostolic Christian and Charity Christian) denominations, Holiness Pacifists such as the Emmanuel Association of Churches and Church of God (Guthrie, Oklahoma), as well as other peace churches like the Quakers, in addition to the Moravian Church, have interpreted this passage to mean that people should do nothing to physically resist an enemy. According to this belief, only God has the right to execute punishments. Nonresistant Christians note that sacrificial love of Jesus resulted in his submission to crucifixion rather than vengeance. Anabaptist theology teaches:

The Moravian Church traditionally has taught the principle of nonresistance. In the Gnadenhutten massacre, members of the U.S. Militia murdered pacifist Moravian Christian Lenape at their settlement in Gnadenhutten (meaning "Houses of Grace" in the German language) and they became recognized as Christian martyrs:

To illustrate how nonresistance works in practice, Alexandre Christoyannopoulos offers the following Christian anarchist response to terrorism:

Author James R. Graham wrote, "The Christian is not a pacifist, he is a non-participationist."

A main application of this theology for nonresistant Christians is to practice conscientious objection with respect to military conscription. In addition to conscientious objection, nonresistant practices of Old Order Mennonites, Amish, and Conservative Mennonites include rejection of the following civil practices (cf. ): sue at law, lobby the government, hold government office, use the force of the law to maintain their "rights" .

See also
 Christian anarchism
 Christian pacifism
 Christian Peacemaker Teams
 Civil resistance
 John Howard Yoder
 Nonviolence
 Nonviolent resistance
 Nonviolent revolution
 Passive obedience
 Peace churches
 Turn the other cheek
 Tolstoyan

Footnotes

References
 NonResistance.org
 The Doctrine of Nonresistance in Anabaptist Theology - Pilgrim Mennonite Conference

 The Principle of Nonresistance - written in 1927 by John Horsch, a Mennonite historian and church leader.
 Nonresistance - article in the Global Anabaptist Mennonite Encyclopedia
 Tolstoy on nonresistance
 Tolstoy's Legacy for Mankind: A Manifesto for Nonviolence, Part 1
 Tolstoy's Legacy for Mankind: A Manifesto for Nonviolence, Part 2

Christian ethics
Nonviolence